Keytone may refer to:
 Key tone (or key note), titular pitch of a musical key 
 Ketones, a chemical family of compounds
 Keytone Records, a record company that has released albums for artists such as founder Chris Hinze

See also 
 Public speaking:
 Keynote 
 Keynote speaker
 Keynote speech

 Signal tone